F. W. Kalbfleisch was a German publishing company based in Gelnhausen. It was founded in 1832 by Johann Carl Janda as a combined printing company, library and stationery shop. In 1833 Janda also founded the newspaper Wöchentliches Unterhaltungsblatt, later renamed Gelnhäuser Tageblatt (de), which still exists. After the death of Johann Carl Janda, his son Jean Janda took over the company in 1869. Jean Janda died in 1888; as he had no children, his step cousin Friedrich Wilhelm Kalbfleisch, who had joined the company as an apprentice in 1880, became the new owner. The company later extended its activities into the academic publishing realm, and published many doctoral dissertations in the first half of the 20th century. The company's founder Johann Carl Janda was the maternal grandfather of the classical philologist Karl Kalbfleisch.

References 

Publishing companies of Germany
Companies established in 1832
Defunct companies of Germany